The Angel of Crooked Street is a 1922 American silent crime drama film directed by David Smith and starring Alice Calhoun, Ralph McCullough and William McCall.

Synopsis
Jennie Marsh, a young woman working as a maid is unjustly accused of theft when the man she brings home a man from dance who proceeds to rob the house of her employer. She is sent to a reformatory and on release is embittered against the world and decides to take revenge on her former employer Mrs. Sandford. She plans to frame her son Schuyler for a robbery he didn't commit.

Cast
 Alice Calhoun as 	Jennie Marsh
 Ralph McCullough as 	Schuyler Sanford
 Scott McKee as 	'Silent' McKay
 Rex Hammel as 'Kid Glove' Thurston
 William McCall as 	'Cap' Berry
 Nellie Anderson as 'Mother' De Vere
 Martha Mattox as Mrs. Phineas Sandford
 Mary Young as 	Mrs. Marsh
 George Stanley as Stoneham
 Walter Cooper as Dan Bolton

References

Bibliography
 Connelly, Robert B. The Silents: Silent Feature Films, 1910-36, Volume 40, Issue 2. December Press, 1998.
 Munden, Kenneth White. The American Film Institute Catalog of Motion Pictures Produced in the United States, Part 1. University of California Press, 1997.

External links
 

1922 films
1922 drama films
1920s English-language films
American silent feature films
American black-and-white films
Films directed by David Smith (director)
Vitagraph Studios films
1920s American films
Silent American drama films